Memory Lane is a 1926 American silent romantic comedy film directed by John M. Stahl and starring Eleanor Boardman, Conrad Nagel, and William Haines.

The film's sets were designed by the art director Cedric Gibbons and A. Arnold Gillespie. The film was made by Louis B. Mayer's production company and released through First National Pictures even though he worked as head of the rival MGM.

Plot
As described in a film magazine review, Mary and Joe are childhood sweethearts, but Joe later goes to New York City to make his fortune and never writes. After a few years, Jimmy Holt comes into her life. On the eve of her wedding, Joe returns to the town and Mary sneaks out of the house to see him and finds that she still cares for her old sweetheart. However, rather than hurt her fiancé, she goes through with the wedding. Joe returns to the city. A few years pass and a baby arrives. Joe hears this news and returns to the village. deciding that it is up to him to ensure she is happy with her life with her husband and child, he acts obnoxiously when he sees her, and Mary is disgusted. Seeing that his stunt worked, Joe returns to New York City.

Cast
 Eleanor Boardman as Mary 
 Conrad Nagel as Jimmy Holt 
 William Haines as Joe Field 
 John Steppling as Mary's Father 
 Eugenie Forde as Mary's Mother 
 Frankie Darro as Urchin 
 Dot Farley as Maid 
 Joan Standing as Maid 
 Kate Price as Phone Booth Woman 
 Florence Midgley
 Dale Fuller
 Billie Bennett

References

Bibliography
 William J. Mann. Wisecracker: The Life and Times of William Haines. Viking, 1998.

External links

1926 films
1926 romantic comedy films
American silent feature films
First National Pictures films
Films directed by John M. Stahl
American romantic comedy films
American black-and-white films
1920s English-language films
1920s American films
Silent romantic comedy films
Silent American comedy films